Domkach or Damkach is a folk dance of Indian states of Bihar and Jharkhand. In Bihar, Domkach dance is performed in Mithila and Bhojpur regions. In Uttar Pradesh, it is a kind of festival.

In Jharkhand, it is Nagpuri folk dance. The women and men of groom's and bridegroom's family perform this dance during all major marriage ceremonies. They form a semi-circle to perform this particular dance by holding waist of each other and lyrics of the song are satirical and full of joy. Nagpuri domkach is further divided into Ekharia domkach, Dohri domkach and Jhumta. The dance is named after Dambru a musical instrument. The dance start in marriage season after Deouthan in Kartik month (October-November) and continue till Rath Yatra in Ashadh Month (June -July) in the starting of rainy season.

References

Indian folk dances
 Dances of India
 Folk dances of Jharkhand
 Folk dances of Chhattisgarh
 Folk dances of Bihar
Nagpuri culture
Circle dances